Millard Seldin (August 8, 1926 – January 24, 2020) was an American real estate developer, banker, basketball investor, and horsebreeder.

Life
Seldin was born on August 8, 1926 in Council Bluffs, Iowa. His father, Ben I. Seldin, an immigrant from Russia, founded Seldin Insurance Co., acquired motels in Iowa, Nebraska and Kansas, and developed 17 apartment complexes and four shopping centers. Seldin served in the United States Navy during World War II for two years, and he graduated from the University of Iowa in 1951.

Seldin co-founded Seldin and Seldin with his father Ben when he was still in college. He later founded Seldin Development and Management Company, a real estate development and management company in Omaha, Nebraska, where he built many structures including the Royalwood Office Center, Camelot Village and Howard Johnson's Motor Lodge. Seldin also co-founded the Hawkeye Bank in Iowa. In 1990, he co-founded Southwest Value Partners, another real estate development company in Scottsdale, Arizona with Robert Sarver. Seldin was also a minority owner in Phoenix Mercury and Phoenix Suns, two basketball teams.

As a horsebreeder, Seldin owned Love Lock, Pretty Greeley, Golden Yank, Cherokee Lord, Dr. Hugs, and Greeley's Conquest. He was named the Nebraska Horse Breeder of the Year by the Thoroughbred Owners and Breeders Association in 1988.

With his wife Beverly, Seldin had two sons, Scott and Derry, and a daughter, Traci Moser. He resided in Omaha, Nebraska and Paradise Valley, Arizona, where he died on January 24, 2020, at age 93.

References

1926 births
2020 deaths
People from Council Bluffs, Iowa
People from Paradise Valley, Arizona
People from Omaha, Nebraska
United States Navy personnel of World War II
American people of Russian-Jewish descent
American racehorse owners and breeders
American real estate businesspeople
American sports owners
University of Iowa alumni
Businesspeople from Iowa
Businesspeople from Nebraska
Businesspeople from Arizona